Steve Baker (born May 6, 1957) is an American retired ice hockey goaltender who played 57 NHL regular season games with the New York Rangers between 1979 and 1983.

Early life 
Baker was born in Boston and raised in Braintree, Massachusetts. He was a member of the Union College men's hockey team, resigning in protest when his coach Ned Harkness was forced to resign.

Career 
Baker was drafted by the Rangers with the 44th pick overall in the 1977 NHL Entry Draft. Highlights of his brief NHL career include losing only one of his first ten National Hockey League games as a rookie in 1979–80 and the 1981 playoffs, when the Rangers advanced to the Stanley Cup semifinals with him as their starting goalie. In the autumn of 1981, Baker served as Tony Esposito's backup on the United States team at the 1981 Canada Cup.

Personal life 
Baker and his wife, Rosemary, have two children.

External links

Hockey Reference
Profile at hockeydraftcentral.com

References 

1957 births
Living people
American men's ice hockey goaltenders
Binghamton Whalers players
Birmingham Bulls draft picks
Ice hockey people from Boston
Maine Mariners players
New Haven Nighthawks players
New York Rangers draft picks
New York Rangers players
Sportspeople from Braintree, Massachusetts
Springfield Indians players
Tampa Bay Lightning scouts
Toledo Goaldiggers players
Tulsa Oilers (1964–1984) players
Union Dutchmen ice hockey players